The North Carolina Department of Administration was established in 1957 and authorized by North Carolina General Statute 143B, Article 9, Paragraph 143B-366.  The department provides business management to the North Carolina government. NCDOA is one of the ten cabinet level agencies. It oversees government operations including facilities construction, purchasing goods, contracting for services, and managing property.

Services
NCDOA houses miscellaneous state government programs. NCDOA is overseeing the state's motor fleet Zero Emissions Vehicle initiative, established by Governor Roy Cooper in 2019. The department publishes breakdowns of state spending, reporting statistics such as per-pupil educational spending. NCDOA administers public relations for state government,  promoting the administration awareness campaigns, such as WalksmartNC pedestrian initiative and the campaign promoting  participation in the U.S. census. In 2019, Secretary Machelle Sanders launched the Lady Cardinal Mentorship Program, a summer program that connects female high school students with women in STEM careers in state government.

Divisions 
Current Divisions of the NCDOA include:
 Commission of Indian Affairs
 Council for Women
 Division of Non-Public Education
 Division of Purchase & Contract
 Division of Veterans Affairs
 Facility Management Division
 Federal Surplus Property Office
 Human Relations Commission
 Human Resources Management
 Justice for Sterilization Victims Foundation
 License to Give Trust Fund Commission
 Mail Service Center
 Management Information Systems
 Motor Fleet Management
 Office for Historically Underutilized Businesses
 Office of Fiscal Management
 State Construction Office
 State Parking Division
 State Property Office
 State Surplus Property Office
 Surplus Property Division
 Youth Advocacy & Involvement Office

Secretaries
The department is headed by a Secretary:
 Pamela B. Cashwell, 2021 – Present
Machelle Sanders, 2017 – 2021
 Kathryn L. Johnston, 2015 – 2017
 William Daughtridge, 2013 – 2015
 Moses Carey Jr., 2010 – 2013
 Britt Cobb, 2006 – 2010
 Gwynn T. Sinson, 2001 – 2006
 Katie G. Dorsett, 1993 – 2001
 James F. Lofton, 1987 – 1993
 Grace J. Rohrer, 1985 – 1987
 Jane S. Patterson, 1981 – 1985
 Joseph W. Grimsley, 1980 – 1981
 Jane S. Patterson (Acting), 1979 – 1980
 Joseph W. Grimsley, 1977 – 1979
 Bruce A. Lentz, 1974 – 1977
 William L. Bondurant, 1973 – 1974
 William L. Turner, 1969 – 1973
 Wayne A. Corpening, 1967 – 1969
 Edward L. Rankin Jr., 1965 – 1967
 Hugh Cannon, 1961 – 1965
 David S. Coltrane, 1960 – 1961
 Paul A. Johnston, 1957 – 1960

References

Government of North Carolina
Administration
1957 establishments in North Carolina
Government agencies established in 1957
Organizations based in Raleigh, North Carolina